Anderson Francisco da Cunha, commonly known as Anderson Mineiro (born April 15, 1986) is a Brazilian footballer who plays for Walter Ormeño de Cañete.

In 2008 season, he played for Olaria since February, and then in August he moved to FC Alania Vladikavkaz.

References

External links
Player page on the official FC Alania Vladikavkaz website 
Anderson Francisco on Russian Premier League 

Brazilian footballers
Brazilian expatriate footballers
FC Spartak Vladikavkaz players
Expatriate footballers in Russia
Association football defenders
Footballers from Rio de Janeiro (city)
1986 births
Living people